Welby is a small town in the Southern Highlands of New South Wales, Australia, in Wingecarribee Shire. It was originally called Fitz Roy. The town is located 1 km west of Mittagong and houses the local Welby cemetery. 

At the 2021 census, there were 764 people living at Welby.

A number of properties, built in both triple brick and stone with bull nose verandas, date back to 1850 and The old Fitz Roy Progress Association Hall which was built in 1931 is still standing. It is now an antique shop - The Merchant of Welby.

Notes and references

Towns of the Southern Highlands (New South Wales)
Hume Highway
Wingecarribee Shire